Nicola Alexis is a British actress best known for playing the role of WPC Ruby Buxton in the long running ITV drama The Bill.

She recently played the lead role in the theatre adaptation of Carl Hiaasen's Lucky You, which premiered at the Edinburgh Festival Fringe in 2008.

She made a guest appearance in EastEnders in August 2015 as the midwife that delivered the stillbirth child of Shabnam Masood and Kush Kazemi (Rakhee Thakrar and Davood Ghadami)

Alexis has been cast in the Harry Potter play Harry Potter and the Cursed Child.

References

External links

 http://www.nicolaalexis.com  website

Year of birth missing (living people)
Living people
British television actresses
British stage actresses